Francis Charles Seymour-Conway, 3rd Marquess of Hertford,  (11 March 1777 – 1 March 1842), styled Viscount Beauchamp between 1793 and 1794 and Earl of Yarmouth between 1794 and 1822, of Ragley Hall in Warwickshire and of Sudbourne Hall in Suffolk, was a British Tory politician and art collector.

Origins
Seymour-Conway was the son of Francis Seymour-Conway, 2nd Marquess of Hertford, by his second wife Isabella Anne Ingram, eldest daughter and co-heiress of Charles Ingram, 9th Viscount of Irvine.

Political career
Lord Yarmouth sat as a Member of Parliament (MP) for Orford in Suffolk (which town was situated within his Sudbourne estate) from 1797 to 1802, for Lisburn from 1802 to 1812, for Antrim from 1812 to 1818 and for Camelford from 1820 to 1822. He served as Secretary of State for War and the Colonies Viscount Castlereagh's second during his 1809 duel with Foreign Secretary George Canning. In March 1812 he was sworn of the Privy Council and appointed Vice-Chamberlain of the Household under Spencer Perceval. He continued in the post after Lord Liverpool became Prime Minister in May 1812 after Perceval's assassination, but relinquished it in July of that year. The same year he was appointed Lord Warden of the Stannaries, a post he held until his death. He succeeded his father in the marquessate in 1822. The same year he was also made a Knight of the Garter and appointed Vice-Admiral of Suffolk, a post he retained until his death.

Art collector
Assisted by his wife's great fortune, Lord Hertford was a notable art collector, as were his son and illegitimate grandson. Much of his collection survives as the Wallace Collection in Hertford House, London, named after Sir Richard Wallace, 1st Baronet, the illegitimate son of the 4th Marquess.

Cricket
Seymour-Conway was an amateur cricketer who made two known appearances in first-class cricket matches in 1799. He was a member of the Marylebone Cricket Club (MCC).

Marriage and issue

On 18 May 1798 he married Maria Emilia Fagnani (1771-1856), known as "Mie-Mie", reputedly the illegitimate daughter of William Douglas, 4th Duke of Queensberry, by his mistress Costanza Brusati ("the Marchesa Fagnani"), the wife of Giacomo II Fagnani, IV marchese di Gerenzano (1740-1785), an Italian nobleman descended from the jurist Raffaele Fagnani (1552-1623), a resident of the Duchy of Milan. Queensbury was the eighth richest man in Britain and having never married, left much of his fortune to Maria, his only offspring. This wealth enabled Hertford to establish his famous art collection, now represented by the Wallace Collection,
named after his grandson Sir Richard Wallace, 1st Baronet, the illegitimate son of the 4th Marquess. Sir Richard Wallace had a special fondness for his grandmother Mie-Mie, possibly as both suffered the stigma of illegitimacy, and in his will the 4th Marquess mentions Sir Richard's kindness to his mother. Sir Richard Wallace erected a monument to his grandmother Maria Fagnani in Sudbourne Church, in the form of the stained glass east window, depicting Mary Magdalene, "the prostitute who washed Jesus’s feet with oil but was also the first person to witness the resurrection", seemingly "an intentional reference to Mie-Mie’s circumstances". By Maria Fagnani he had three children:
Lady Frances Maria Seymour-Conway (d. 1822);
Richard Seymour-Conway, 4th Marquess of Hertford (1800–1870), eldest son and heir;
Lord Henry Seymour-Conway (1805–1859), founder of the Jockey Club in Paris. He inherited much of his mother's wealth, and died unmarried in Paris, having bequeathed  the residue of his income, about £36,000 per annum, to Paris hospitals. He was buried in his mother's vault in the Cemetery of Père-Lachaise, also the burial place of his nephew Sir Richard Wallace.

Death and succession

In Hertford's last years the mental instability which had afflicted several members of his family became noticeable and he is said to have lived with a retinue of prostitutes. The diarist Charles Greville stated of him "there has been, so far as I know, no such example of undisguised debauchery" and described him as broken with infirmities and unable to speak due to paralysis of the tongue. He died in March 1842, aged 64, and was succeeded by his eldest son Richard Seymour-Conway, 4th Marquess of Hertford. The Marchioness of Hertford died in March 1856, aged 84.

Legacy
Lord Hertford was the prototype for the characters of the Marquess of Monmouth in Benjamin Disraeli's 1844 novel Coningsby and Lord Steyne in William Makepeace Thackeray's 1847–8 serial Vanity Fair. Thackeray's illustration of the Marquis for issue 11 was considered to bear such a resemblance to Hertford that threat of prosecution for libel effectively suppressed its publication.

References

External links 
 

1777 births
1842 deaths
Knights of the Garter
Members of the Privy Council of the United Kingdom
Yarmouth, Francis Seymour-Conway, Earl of
Yarmouth, Francis Seymour-Conway, Earl of
Yarmouth, Francis Seymour-Conway, Earl of
Yarmouth, Francis Seymour-Conway, Earl of
Yarmouth, Francis Seymour-Conway, Earl of
People associated with the Wallace Collection
Yarmouth, Francis Seymour-Conway, Earl of
Yarmouth, Francis Seymour-Conway, Earl of
Yarmouth, Francis Seymour-Conway, Earl of
Yarmouth, Francis Seymour-Conway, Earl of
Yarmouth, Francis Seymour-Conway, Earl of
Yarmouth, Francis Seymour-Conway, Earl of
Hertford, M3
Francis
Ambassadors of the United Kingdom to France
English cricketers
English cricketers of 1787 to 1825
Surrey cricketers
Non-international England cricketers
Marylebone Cricket Club cricketers
3